The Ivanhorod Einsatzgruppen photograph is a prominent depiction of the Holocaust in Ukraine, on the Eastern Front of World War II. Dated to 1942, it shows a soldier aiming his rifle at a woman who is trying to shield a child with her body, portraying one of numerous genocidal killings carried out against Jews by the Einsatzgruppen within German-occupied Europe. It was taken in Ivanhorod, a village in German-occupied Ukraine, before being mailed to Nazi Germany. However, the Polish resistance intercepted the photograph in Warsaw, and it was subsequently kept as Holocaust imagery by Polish photographer Jerzy Tomaszewski. In the 1960s, it was alleged that the photograph was a communist forgery, but that claim was eventually proven false. Since then, it has been frequently used in books, museums, and exhibitions focused on the Holocaust. British photographic historian Janina Struk describes it as "a symbol of the barbarity of the Nazi regime and their industrial-scale murder of six million European Jews."

Background 

During the Holocaust, more than a million Jews were murdered in Ukraine. Most of them were shot in mass executions by Einsatzgruppen (death squads) and Ukrainian collaborators. In 1897, the Russian Empire Census found that there were 442 Jews (out of a population of 3,032) living in Ivanhorod, a village today in the Cherkasy Oblast, central Ukraine. In 1942, a mass shooting by Einsatzgruppen south of the town killed an unknown number of victims. Part of the massacre is depicted in this photograph. After the war, the execution site was used as a field of a collective farm.

Photograph

There are six victims in the photograph. The body lying at the feet of the German soldier appears to be a woman who was already shot. In the center of the photograph is a woman who appears to be shielding a child. One of her feet is raised as if she is trying to flee, or else the photograph was taken just after she was shot. To her right are three men. Only one soldier is fully visible in the picture; he appears to be aiming at the woman and child. Rifles held by German soldiers off the left edge of the photograph are visible and point at the woman and child. The shadows at the left edge of the photograph suggest that more German soldiers may be present. A wooden stake and a shovel are visible on the right side of the photo, indicating that the victims may have been forced to dig their own graves.

The identity of the photographer is unknown, but he was probably a German soldier. Many German soldiers photographed atrocities in which they were complicit.

Discovery and publication

The Polish resistance infiltrated the postal office in Warsaw in order to intercept sensitive correspondence, which they sent to the Polish government-in-exile in London. Poles and Jews were forbidden to own cameras, but the Polish resistance established underground workshops for developing clandestine photographs of Nazi atrocities. A teenage boy named Jerzy Tomaszewski worked with an underground lab called "Foto-Rys", and he intercepted a photograph with the words "Ukraine 1942, Judenaktion [Jewish Action], Iwangorod [Ivanhorod]" written on the reverse. He kept the original, which remains in his personal archive; a copy was sent to the government-in-exile in London.

The photograph was first published in Poland in 1959 by the Society of Fighters for Freedom and Democracy on the cover of a book of photographs entitled 1939–1945. We have not forgotten / Nous n'avons pas oublié / Wir haben es nicht vergessen. Tomaszewski worked as one of the editors, although he knew that the book was using the photographs for Communist propaganda; he supported the publication because there was no other way to print the photographs. Many publications crop the image to the one soldier, the woman, and the child. Photography historian Janina Struk states that cropping the image omits "the less emotional and more confusing parts of the picture". Educator Adam Muller states that while the cropped version highlights "the catastrophic intensity of the mother–child bond", it also removes the surroundings and context from consideration. The full version reveals that the scene is not one of personal suffering and individual brutality, but a mass execution.

Since then, the Ivanhorod photograph has been reproduced in many books, museums, and exhibitions relating to the Holocaust. In her book Reading the Holocaust, it was described by Inga Clendinnen as "iconic in its distillation of German atrocity". According to Robert Fisk, the photograph is "one of the most impressive and persuasive images of the Nazi Holocaust". Struk stated that it "has become a symbol of the barbarity of the Nazi regime and of the murder of 6 million European Jews".

Falsification allegations
The far-right West German newspaper Deutsche Soldaten Zeitung (DSZ, German Soldiers' Newspaper) printed an allegation on 26 January 1962 by Otto Croy, known for his writings on photographic technique, under the title Achtung Fälschungen ("Beware Fakes"). Croy claimed that the photograph had been fabricated by Communist authorities in Poland in order to falsely accuse Germany of war crimes; he alleged that the image did not depict a German soldier and that the weapons and uniforms were not authentic. Before publishing 1939–1945. We have not forgotten, West German publishing house  had verified the authenticity of the image by writing to Roman Karsk, professor of German literature at the University of Warsaw, and he replied that it was a faithful copy of an image held by the historical archives in Warsaw depicting 1942 mass shootings.

In response to the allegations, Tomaszewski and Tadeusz Mazur (one of the editors of 1939–1945. We have not forgotten) published another image from the same source in the Polish magazine Świat on 25 February. The second image depicted five armed men, one in civilian clothes and the other four in uniform, standing and looking at the camera over a pile of corpses. It bore several similarities to the better-known photograph, but lacked the "dramatic impact", according to Struk. The flat, barren terrain was identical; one of the men bore a strong resemblance to a soldier in the previous photograph; and the words "Ukraine 1942" had been written on the back of the image in the same handwriting. In the article, Tomaszewski described the DSZ as a supporter of the Third Reich and accused the paper of "revisionism".

The allegations continued to be recirculated in the West German press for more than two years, in what Tomaszewski described as a "press war". The Polish government was concerned about a potential diplomatic incident if the image was in fact a falsification, and they sent officials to Tomaszewski's home to inspect the image. In 1965, Der Spiegel published a letter from Kurt Vieweg, a former member of a German police battalion stationed in Norway, and he confirmed that the weapons and uniforms matched those used by his unit and those of the Einsatzgruppen.

References

1942 photographs
1942 in military history
1942 in Poland
1942 in Ukraine
Anonymous works
Einsatzgruppen
Forgery controversies
History of Cherkasy Oblast
Holocaust photographs
The Holocaust in Ukraine
Polish resistance during World War II
Black-and-white photographs